Crucian can refer to:

 A person who is from Saint Croix, U.S. Virgin Islands
 A dialect of Virgin Islands Creole, spoken on St. Croix, U.S. Virgin Islands
 Crucian carp, a freshwater fish
 Crucian (Dungeons & Dragons), a creature in Dungeons & Dragons

Language and nationality disambiguation pages